Franciscus "Frans" de Vreng (11 April 1898 in Amsterdam – 13 March 1974 in Amsterdam) was a track cyclist who represented the Netherlands at the 1920 Summer Olympics in Antwerp, Belgium. There he won the bronze medal in the 2,000m tandem competition, alongside Piet Ikelaar.

See also
 List of Dutch Olympic cyclists

References

External links
  
 
 

1898 births
1974 deaths
Dutch male cyclists
Cyclists at the 1920 Summer Olympics
Olympic cyclists of the Netherlands
Olympic bronze medalists for the Netherlands
Cyclists from Amsterdam
Dutch track cyclists
Olympic medalists in cycling
Medalists at the 1920 Summer Olympics
19th-century Dutch people
20th-century Dutch people